Charles Roscoe Barnes (May 8, 1850 – February 5, 1915) was one of the stars of baseball's National Association (1871–1875) and the early National League (1876–1881), playing second base and shortstop.  He played for the dominant Boston Red Stockings teams of the early 1870s, along with Albert Spalding, Cal McVey, George Wright, Harry Wright, Jim O'Rourke, and Deacon White.  Despite playing for these star-studded teams, many claim that Ross was the most valuable to his teams.

Early life
Roscoe Charles Barnes was born on May 8, 1850 in Mount Morris, Livingston County, New York.

Career

From 1868 to 1870, Ross starred for the Rockford Forest Citys, along with Albert Spalding, attaining professional status in the second year.  When the National Association was formed in 1871, Harry Wright signed both men to his new team in Boston.  Barnes's major league career thus started when he was 21.  He split time between second base and shortstop for the Boston Red Stockings of the new National Association.  Barnes led the league with 66 runs scored and 91 total bases, finishing second in batting average at .401.

In 1872, he led the Association with a .432 batting average, a .585 slugging percentage, 99 base hits, 134 total bases, and 28 doubles.  The Red Stockings began a four-year dominance of the Association, with Barnes a key player each year.  Barnes again led the Association in 1873, hitting .425, as well as leading in on-base percentage (.456), slugging percentage (.584), base hits (137), runs scored (125), total bases (188), doubles (29), bases on balls (28), and stolen bases (13).  His .340 BA in 1874 was good enough for eighth in the league, while his .364 was good for second in 1875, while leading again in runs scored (115), base hits (143) and on-base percentage (.375).

His Red Stockings went a combined 205-50 from 1872-75, a winning percentage not matched by any team since.  

Before the 1875 season ended, Barnes and four other Boston players signed contracts with the Chicago White Stockings.  When word leaked out in Boston before the end of the season, Barnes and his teammates were reviled by Boston fans, being called "seceders", a strong epithet just a decade after the Civil War.  It was likely that the National Association would void the signing, but Chicago owner William Hulbert preempted the move by forming the National League and causing the NA to disband.  

Barnes's new team finished first in the NL's first season with a 55–12 record, while Boston fell to fourth.  Ross led the National League batting (.429), on-base percentage (.462), slugging (.562), runs (126), hits (138), bases (190), doubles (21), triples (14), and walks (20). In the 1876 season, Barnes also established the single-season record for runs per game (1.91), a mark which still stands. Barnes also has the distinction of having hit the first home run in National League history, on May 2, 1876. In the 1876 season Barnes not only lead the league in runs scored but had scored 54 more runs than any other player, the largest margin ever in the history of Major League Baseball.

Fair-Foul Bunt Rule Change
Barnes specialized in the fair-foul bunt in which he was so dominant that the National League changed its rules after the 1876 season to eliminate.  At that time home plate was made of cast iron, and was further forward than it is now and in fair territory.  If a batted ball first landed in fair territory, it remained fair even if it rolled into foul territory immediately.  And in the 1870s hitters were allowed to call for the pitch to be either high or low.  Many hitters would call for the pitch to be low, and then bunt the ball so that it landed fair and rolled foul, in which case it would be impossible for the defense to throw them out.  Barnes was the master at this, but differently than the other players he would take a full swing, aim for the top of ball, so that it would bounce of home plate, and then roll way foul.  And when the infielders would position themselves to field the bunt, Barnes would often swing away to keep them off balance. This technique allowed Barnes to be dominant, often hitting over .400, and lead the major leagues in ways that were unequaled.  However, once the rule was changed, Barnes offensive career collapsed and he never again hit even .300.    

In 1877, Barnes fell ill with what was then only described as an "ague", played only 22 games, and did not play well when he was in the lineup. The illness robbed Barnes of much of his strength and agility and shortened his career. Though some have blamed a rule change regarding foul balls for Barnes's decline, Nate Silver argues that the illness was likely the primary factor that hurt Barnes's career.

The remainder of his career was an effort to return to glory ending in mediocrity.  He played for the Tecumseh team in the International Association (arguably baseball's first minor league) in 1878, returned to the National League with the Cincinnati club in 1879, sat out all of 1880, and finished his professional career in 1881, playing his last season in Boston, the site of his former glory. After 1876, he never hit better than .272, and his other totals were barely half of those from his glory days.  He retired at age 31.  He finished his career with 859 hits, 698 runs, and a .359 average, in only 499 games played and 2392 at bats.  His 1.4 runs per game played remains the best of all time.

Barnes briefly returned to professional baseball in 1890, serving as an umpire for the Players' League.

Evaluation

Barnes is only one of four players ever, the others being Babe Ruth, Ricky Henderson, and Aaron Judge, in the history of Major League Baseball to lead his league in runs scored with more than 30 runs over the next closest player; in 1876 Barnes had 54 more runs scored than the next closest player, which is the largest differential ever in the major leagues.

Barnes holds the career NA records in runs (459), hits (530), doubles (99), walks (55), stolen bases (73), total bases (695), times on base (585), runs produced (694), batting average (.390), on-base percentage (.413), and slugging percentage (.511).

During the late 19th and early 20th century, Barnes was highly regarded by many baseball observers. In 1903, sportswriter Tim Murnane wrote that Barnes was the “king of second baseman, as well as the finest batsman and run-getter of all time.” However, the memory of Barnes's accomplishments waned as the 20th century progressed.

In the 21st century, Barnes has received some retroactive recognition by baseball writers. In 2007, Nate Silver wrote that Barnes was "arguably the single most dominant player in Major League history."

Personal life

Barnes held a variety of white-collar jobs in the Chicago area after his baseball career, including serving as an accountant with People's Gas, Light & Coke Company.  A bachelor for most of his life, Barnes married Ellen Welsh in 1900. He died from heart disease in 1915.

See also
 List of Major League Baseball batting champions
 List of Major League Baseball annual runs scored leaders
 List of Major League Baseball annual doubles leaders
 List of Major League Baseball annual triples leaders
List of Major League Baseball single-game hits leaders

References

"The National League's First Batting Champ", Baseball Research Journal, John Duxbury, Society for American Baseball Research (SABR) (1976)
"Roscoe Conkling Barnes", Nineteenth Century Stars, Frank V. Phelps, SABR (1989) 
Blackguards and Red Stockings, William J. Ryczek, Colebrook Press (1992) 
National Association of Base Ball Players, Marshall D. Wright, McFarland Publishing (2000) 
"The Lost Art of Fair-Foul Hitting", The National Pastime, Robert H. Schaefer, SABR (2000)

External links

1850 births
1915 deaths
19th-century baseball players
Baseball players from New York (state)
Boston Red Caps players
Boston Red Stockings players
Chicago White Stockings players
Cincinnati Reds (1876–1879) players
London Tecumseh players
Major League Baseball infielders
Minor league baseball managers
National League batting champions
Sportspeople from Rockford, Illinois
Rockford Forest Citys (NABBP) players
People from Mount Morris, New York